Verschaffelt is the name of

Peter Anton von Verschaffelt, a Belgian sculptor and architect
Ambroise Verschaffelt, a Belgian botanist
Jules-Émile Verschaffelt, a Belgian physicist